May Township is an inactive township in Platte County, in the U.S. state of Missouri.

May Township has the name of B. L. May, a local medical doctor.

References

Townships in Missouri
Townships in Platte County, Missouri